Marianne Baudler (27 April 1921 – 5 March 2003) was a German chemist. She is known for her research on phosphorus.

Life
Marianne Baudler was born in Stettin. She started studying Chemistry at the TH Dresden in April 1940 and finished her studies with a Diplom in 1943. From 1943 to 1946, she worked on her dissertation in the group of Franz Fehér at the University of Göttingen. Starting in 1949, Baudler performed research at the University of Cologne. In 1952, she finished her habilitation. In 1963 she became extraordinary professor at the University of Cologne. In 1968, the full professorship followed. From 1986 on, she was an emeritus professor.

Research 
Her research focused on:

 Small-ring phosphorus compounds
 Phosphorus hydrides
 Polycyclic organophosphanes
 Mono- and polycyclic compounds of arsenic

Selected publications

Awards
Alfred Stork Memorial Prize in 1986
 Member of the Academy of Sciences Leopoldina starting in 1982
 Member of the Göttingen Academy of Sciences and Humanities starting in 1991
 Wiberg Lecture in 1992

References

1921 births
2003 deaths
20th-century German chemists
German women chemists
20th-century German women scientists
Academic staff of the University of Cologne
Members of the Göttingen Academy of Sciences and Humanities